The Interborough Rapid Transit Company (IRT) was the private operator of New York City's original underground subway line that opened in 1904, as well as earlier elevated railways and additional rapid transit lines in New York City. The IRT was purchased by the city in June 1940, along with the younger BMT and IND systems, to form the modern New York City Subway. The former IRT lines (the numbered routes in the current subway system) are now the A Division or IRT Division of the Subway.

History 
The first IRT subway ran between City Hall and 145th Street at Broadway, opening on October 27, 1904. It opened following more than twenty years of public debate on the merits of subways versus the existing elevated rail system and on various proposed routes.

Founded on May 6, 1902, by August Belmont, Jr., the IRT's mission was to operate New York City's initial underground rapid transit system after Belmont's and John B. McDonald's Rapid Transit Construction Company was awarded the rights to build the railway line in 1900, outbidding Andrew Onderdonk. The Manhattan Railway Company was the operator of four elevated railways in Manhattan with an extension into the Bronx. 

On April 1, 1903, over a year before its first subway line opened, the IRT acquired the Manhattan Railway Company by lease, gaining a monopoly on rapid transit in Manhattan. The IRT coordinated some services between what became its subway and elevated divisions, but all the lines of the former Manhattan EL have since been dismantled.

In 1913, as a result of massive expansion in the city, the IRT signed the Dual Contracts with Brooklyn Rapid Transit (BRT) in order to expand the subway. The agreement also locked the subway fare at 5 cents for forty-nine years. The IRT unsuccessfully attempted to raise the fare to seven cents in 1929, in a case that went to the United States Supreme Court.

The IRT ceased to function as a privately held company on June 12, 1940, when its properties and operations were acquired by the City of New York.

Today, the IRT lines are operated as the A Division of the subway. The remaining lines are underground in Manhattan, except for a short stretch across Harlem at 125th Street and in northernmost Manhattan. Its many lines in the Bronx are predominantly elevated, with some subway, and some railroad-style right-of-way acquired from the defunct New York, Westchester and Boston Railway, which now constitutes the IRT Dyre Avenue Line. Its Brooklyn lines are underground with a single elevated extension that reaches up to New Lots Avenue, and the other reaching Flatbush Avenue via the underground Nostrand Avenue Line. 

The Flushing Line, its sole line in Queens, is entirely elevated except for a short portion approaching its East River tunnel and its terminal at Flushing–Main Street (the whole Manhattan portion of the line is underground). The Flushing Line has had no track connection to the rest of the IRT since 1942, when service on the Second Avenue El was discontinued. It is connected to the BMT and the rest of the system via the BMT Astoria Line on the upper level of the Queensboro Plaza station.

Lines

Original IRT system (1904-1909)

Subway Division 

 West Branch
 Broadway Line (Atlantic Avenue to 242nd Street, with intermediate terminals at South Ferry and City Hall)
 East Branch
 Lenox Avenue Line (Atlantic Avenue to 145th Street, with intermediate terminals at South Ferry and City Hall)
 Westchester Avenue Branch (135th Street to 180th Street)

Manhattan Railway Division 

 Eastern Division
 Second Avenue Line (South Ferry to 129th Street)
 Third Avenue Line (South Ferry to Bronx Park Terminal, with an intermediate terminal at Willis Avenue)
 City Hall Branch (City Hall to Chatham Square)
 34th Street Branch (Third Avenue to 34th Street Ferry)
 42nd Street Branch (42nd Street to Grand Central)
 Western Division
 Sixth Avenue Line (South Ferry to 155th Street, with an intermediate terminal at 58th Street)
 Ninth Avenue Line (South Ferry to 155th Street)

Expansion (1917-1928)

The Bronx and Manhattan
Trunk lines include:
Lexington Avenue Line, under Park and Lexington Avenues, as well as under Lafayette Street and Broadway
Broadway–Seventh Avenue Line, under and over Broadway, as well as under Seventh Avenue, Varick Street, and West Broadway
Flushing Line, under 41st and 42nd Streets
42nd Street Line, under 42nd Street

Branch lines include:
Lenox Avenue Line, under Lenox Avenue and Central Park
White Plains Road Line, under East 149th Street, and over  Westchester Avenue, Southern Boulevard, Boston Road, and White Plains Road
Pelham Line, under East 138th Street and Southern Boulevard, and over Westchester Avenue
Jerome Avenue Line, under Grand Concourse,  over River and Jerome Avenues,

Brooklyn and Queens
There were three Brooklyn lines built by the IRT:
Eastern Parkway Line, under Fulton Street, Flatbush Avenue, and Eastern Parkway
New Lots Line, over East 98th Street and Livonia Avenue
Nostrand Avenue Line, under Nostrand Avenue

The only line in Queens is the Flushing Line, under 50th Avenue, and over Queens Boulevard and Roosevelt Avenue.

River Crossings
(of the East and Harlem Rivers, from south to north)
Joralemon Street Tunnel
Clark Street Tunnel
Steinway Tunnel
Lexington Avenue Tunnel
149th Street Tunnel
Broadway Bridge

After 1940
Dyre Avenue Line, parallel to the Esplanade, and on the old right-of-way of the New York, Westchester and Boston Railway in 1941
Flushing Line, in October 1949, the joint BMT/IRT service arrangement ended. The Flushing Line became the responsibility of IRT. The Astoria Line had its platforms shaved back for exclusive BMT operation.
Lenox Avenue Line to Harlem–148th Street, at-grade parallel to 149th Street in 1968
Broadway–Seventh Avenue Line to new South Ferry island-platformed stations, opened in March 2009. It closed temporarily from October 28, 2012 to June 27, 2017 because of Hurricane Sandy.
Flushing Line to 34th Street–Hudson Yards, under 41st Street and 11th Avenue, opened in September 2015

Surviving IRT equipment
Several pieces of pre-unification IRT equipment have been preserved in various museums. While some of the equipment are operational, others are in need of restoration or are used simply as static displays.
 Manhattan El revenue collection car G is preserved at the Shore Line Trolley Museum.
 IRT elevated motorman instruction car 824 is preserved at the Shore Line Trolley Museum.
 Richmond Shipyard Railway cars 561 and 563 (ex-Manhattan El cars 844 and 889) are preserved at the Western Railway Museum in Rio Vista, California.
 The private car of August Belmont Jr., numbered 3344 and named the Mineola, is preserved at the Shore Line Trolley Museum.
 Gibbs car 3352 is preserved at the Seashore Trolley Museum.
 Deck Roof car 3662 is preserved at the Shore Line Trolley Museum.
 Lo-V cars 4902, 5290, 5292, 5443, 5466, 5483 and 5600 have been preserved. Cars 4092, 5290, 5292, 5442 and 5483 are preserved by the New York Transit Museum and Railway Preservation Corp. Car 5466 is preserved at the Shore Line Trolley Museum. Car 5600 is preserved at the Trolley Museum of New York.
 World's Fair Lo-V car 5655 is preserved by the New York Transit Museum.

See also
Other NYC Subway Companies:
 Brooklyn–Manhattan Transit Corporation (BMT)
 Brooklyn Rapid Transit Company (BRT)
 Independent Subway System (ISS)

Also:
 History of the IRT subway before 1918
 New York IRT—Soccer team sponsored by IRT
 IRT Rangers—Soccer team sponsored by IRT

References

External links

 
 
 

 
Belmont family
Defunct New York (state) railroads
Defunct public transport operators in the United States
Historic American Engineering Record in New York City
History of the New York City Subway
Transportation companies of the United States
Transportation companies based in New York City
1904 establishments in New York City
1940 disestablishments in New York (state)